Vulture bees, also known as carrion bees, are a small group of three closely related South American stingless bee species in the genus Trigona which feed on rotting meat. Vulture bees produce a substance similar to royal jelly which is not derived from nectar, but rather from protein-rich secretions of the bees' hypopharyngeal glands. These secretions are likely derived from the bees' diet, which consists of carrion eaten outside the nest, and resulted in the belief that they produce what is known as “meat honey”. This unusual behavior was only discovered in 1982, nearly two centuries after the bees were first classified.

Taxonomy
The three species in this group are:

 Trigona crassipes (Fabricius, 1793)
 Trigona necrophaga (Camargo & Roubik, 1991)
 Trigona hypogea (Silvestri, 1902)

Description

As with many types of stingless bee, the vulture bee has strong, powerful mandibles, which it uses to tear off flesh. Vulture bees have been recorded as foraging from more than 75 different species of animal.

Forager vulture bees enter dead animals through the eye sockets, collecting flesh, which is consumed. Similar to how honeybees process nectar with the aim of eventual regurgitation and storage as honey, the flesh a forager vulture bee eats is, upon return to the hive, regurgitated and passed to a worker bee. The flesh is consumed by the bee and processed by its highly-acidic gut, specialised to help break down the meat, before the bee then regurgitates a honey-like substance from its hypopharyngeal glands, the same gland used by honeybees to produce royal jelly. The substance is rich and high in protein. Unlike honeybees, vulture bees do not produce an excess of honey, instead producing only what is necessary to sustain the hive.

“Meat honey” 
The vulture bee is sometimes known for producing a so-called “meat honey”, which is a belief resulting from scientific uncertainty and misinformation. It may be that the type of royal jelly produced by the bees as a protein intake is directly derived from the rotten meat, which can be confused with “meat honey” (although royal jelly, even the “regular” type seen in honeybees, is not honey). Another theory is that, since the honey and rotten flesh are stored in proximity of one another within the hive, they sometimes come in contact, leading to the belief that the resulting mixture (“meat honey”) is the normal process by which the bee produces its honey. It would be improper for human consumption, leading to sickness or even death in severe cases. The actual honey is of unknown, controversial, or poorly documented origin.

Ecology and behavior
Vulture bees, much like maggots, usually enter the carcass through the eyes. They will then root around inside gathering the meat suitable for their needs. The vulture bee salivates on the rotting flesh and then consumes it, storing the flesh in its crop. When it returns to the hive, this meat is regurgitated and processed by a worker bee, which then re-secretes the resulting proteins as a decay-resistant edible glucose product resembling honey. These protein-rich secretions are then placed into pot-like containers within the hive until it is time to feed the immature bees. The secretions replace the role of pollen in the bees' diet, as vulture bees lack adaptations for carrying pollen and pollen stores are absent from their nests, though they do also store honey, which is of unknown origin. Larvae are fed on the carrion-based substance, while the adult bees consume the honey.

The flavor of this honey-resembling substance is described as intense, smokey, and salty, or uniquely sweet.

References

Further reading
 
 

Trigona